Maury Rosenberg (born December 18, 1964) is an American singer-songwriter and accordionist from Long Beach, New York. He graduated from the Berklee College of Music, in Boston, Massachusetts. Rosenberg is most well known as the frontman of Hypnotic Clambake.

Biography
Rosenberg grew up in Long Beach, New York, the son of a Holocaust survivor. His exposure to Jewish culture in New York played an influential role in his musical development. Throughout his career he would go on to incorporate elements of Jewish music into many of his projects. He moved to Boston to attend the Berklee College of Music, where he completed a Bachelor of Arts degree in film scoring in 1987.  
  
Early in his career, Rosenberg worked with the Boston Ballet as a rehearsal pianist. During his time in Boston, he also worked with musical groups Border Patrol and the Shirim Klezmer Orchestra.  Some of his piano work was used in Woody Allen's 1997 film Deconstructing Harry.

In 1989, Rosenberg founded the group Hypnotic Clambake. The project was originally meant only for the recording studio, though Rosenberg later decided to assemble a touring group, thus beginning the band's long and ever-evolving live performance career. Hypnotic Clambake is currently based in Rochester, New York. Rosenberg also performs occasionally with the bands Zydeco Vacation and the New York Klezmer Orchestra.

Discography
Shirim Klezmer Orchestra: Naftule's Dream (1992)
New York Klezmer Orchestra (2004)
Hypnotic Clambake discography:
Square Dance Messiah (1991)
Gondola to Heaven (1993)
Kent the Zen Master (1995)
Frozen Live, Vol. 1 (1997)
White Christmas Stallion (1997)
Rutland Live – New Year's Eve (1999–2000)
Varicose Brain (2001)
Mayonnaise (2005)

References

External links
 Official Maury Rosenberg website
 Official Hypnotic Clambake website
 Official New York Klezmer Orchestra website
 Outrageous Universe Revival Festival (OUR Fest) website

1964 births
American accordionists
American male singer-songwriters
Jewish American musicians
Living people
Singer-songwriters from New York (state)
21st-century accordionists
21st-century American male musicians
Hypnotic Clambake members
21st-century American Jews